The '''Men's 100 metres T11''' event at the 2016 Paralympic Games took place between 10 and 11 September 2016, at the Estádio Olímpico João Havelange. The event was held over three rounds.

Records

These were the World and Paralympic Games records at the beginning of the event.

Heats

Heat 1 
10:12 10 September 2016:

Heat 2 
10:19 10 September 2016:

Heat 3 
10:26 10 September 2016:

Heat 4 
10:33 10 September 2016:

Heat 5 
10:40 10 September 2016:

Semifinals

Semifinal 1 
20:00 10 September 2016:

Semifinal 2 
20:06 10 September 2016:

Semifinal 3 
20:12 10 September 2016:

Final 
19:02 11 September 2016:

Notes

Athletics at the 2016 Summer Paralympics
2016 in men's athletics